This is a list of destinations served by Henan Airlines.

Asia
People's Republic of China
Anhui
Hefei (Hefei Xinqiao International Airport)
Beijing
Beijing (Beijing Capital International Airport)
Fujian
Fuzhou (Fuzhou Changle International Airport)
Inner Mongolia
Hailar (Hailar Dongshan Airport)
Hohhot (Hohhot Baita International Airport)
Manzhouli (Manzhouli Airport)
Gansu
Dunhuang (Dunhuang Airport)
Jiayuguan (Jiayuguan Airport)
Lanzhou (Lanzhou Airport)
Guangxi
Nanning (Nanning Wuxu International Airport)
Wuzhou (Wuzhou Changzhoudao Airport)
Hebei
Qinhuangdao (Qinhuangdao Shanhaiguan Airport)
Shijiazhuang (Shijiazhuang Daguocun International Airport)
Heilongjiang
Harbin (Harbin Taiping International Airport)
Yichun (Yichun Airport)
Hubei
Xiangfan (Xiangfan Airport)
Wuhan (Wuhan Tianhe International Airport)
Jilin
Changchun (Changchun Longjia International Airport)
Jiangsu
Nanjing (Nanjing Lukou International Airport)
Liaoning
Shenyang (Shenyang Taoxian International Airport)
Ningxia
Yinchuan (Yinchuan Helanshan Airport)
Shaanxi
Xi'an (Xi'an Xianyang International Airport) - Hub
Yulin (Yulin Airport)
Shandong
Linyi (Linyi Airport)
Yantai (Yantai Laishan International Airport)
Shanxi
Taiyuan (Taiyuan Wusu Airport)
Tianjin
Tianjin (Tianjin Binhai International Airport)
Zhejiang
Huangyan (Huangyan Luqiao Airport)

Lists of airline destinations